Fläskpannkaka is a Swedish oven-made pancake baked from eggs, milk, flour, salt (similar to a Yorkshire pudding) containing pieces of sliced pork or bacon. The ingredients are placed in a pan and baked in the oven. 
It is commonly served with lingonberry jam. Varieties of the dish contain onion, apples, blueberries or garlic.

See also
 List of pancakes
Swedish cuisine

References

External links
 Recipe for Fläskpannkaka

Pancakes
Swedish pastries
Pork dishes